Ogbu Uke Kalu (1942 – 2009) was a Nigerian theologian. He was known as a major figure in the study of African Christianity, especially with relationship to African Pentecostalism.

Biography 
Born in Ohafia (now part of Abia State, Nigeria), Kalu first studied at Hope Waddell Training Institute in Calabar before moving to Canada, completing a BA at the University of Toronto (1967), MA in history at McMaster University (1968), and a PhD in history at the University of Toronto (1972). He later completed an MDiv at Princeton Theological Seminary (1974).

In 1974, Kalu took up a post in the Department of Religious Studies at the University of Nigeria, holding various teaching and administrative posts within the University's structures until 2001. He then took up the Henry Winters Luce Professor of World Christianity and Mission at McCormick Theological Seminary, a post he held until his unexpected death in 2009.

He is most known for his scholarship in African Christianity, especially his magnum opus African Pentecostalism: An Introduction (Oxford 2008).

Honors 
In 1997, Kalu was honored with an honorary Doctor of Divinity at Presbyterian College at McGill University. In 2019, the Ogbu Kalu Center for Christianity and African Culture was established at Abia State University.

In 2005, a festschrift was published in his honor, entitled ''Religion, History, and Politics in Nigeria: Essays in Honor of Ogbu U. Kalu.

Works

References 

1942 births
2009 deaths
Nigerian Presbyterians
University of Toronto alumni
McMaster University alumni
Princeton Theological Seminary alumni
Academic staff of the University of Nigeria
McCormick Theological Seminary
World Christianity scholars